Leckfurin is a small remote village, which lies on the left bank of the River Naver,  in northern Sutherland in  Scottish Highlands and is in the Scottish council area of Highland.

The A836 road runs through Leckfurin.

References

Populated places in Sutherland